Government Shaheed Suhrawardy Collegeis a public college in Laxsmibazar near Bahadurshah Park of Old Dhaka, Bangladesh. It offers higher-secondary education (HSC).It offers bachelor's degree and master's degree programs which are affiliated to the University of Dhaka since 16 February 2017.

History

References

Organisations based in Dhaka
Education in Dhaka
Schools in Dhaka District
Educational institutions established in 1949
1949 establishments in East Pakistan
University of Dhaka affiliates